Carolin Schäfer (born 5 December 1991) is a German athlete who specialises in the heptathlon.

Schäfer represented Germany at the 2012 European Athletics Championships where she finished 11th in the heptathlon, scoring 6003 points. She finished 5th at the 2016 Summer Olympics
in Rio de Janeiro, Brazil. In 2017, Schäfer earned the silver medal at the World Championships in London with the result of 6696 points. She won the bronze medal at the 2018 European Championships.

Achievements

References

External links

 
 
 
 
 
 

1991 births
Living people
People from Bad Wildungen
Sportspeople from Kassel (region)
German heptathletes
Olympic heptathletes
Olympic athletes of Germany
Athletes (track and field) at the 2016 Summer Olympics
World Athletics Championships athletes for Germany
World Athletics Championships medalists
European Athletics Championships medalists
German national athletics champions
Athletes (track and field) at the 2020 Summer Olympics
20th-century German women
21st-century German women